Vembayam  is a village in Thiruvananthapuram district in the state of Kerala, India.

Location
Vembayam is located on Main Central Road, at a distance of 21 km from Thiruvananthapuram. It comes under Nedumangad Taluk.  Nearest airport is Thiruvananthapuram International Airport and railway station is Thiruvananthapuram central Railway station. Vembayam is surrounded by two Grama panchayath Vembayam and Manikkal ,  East by Pothencode ,  West by Nedumangad  municipality and South by Karakulam . Kerala State Road Transport Corporation operates a bus mini terminal at Vembayam jn. It is well connected to all parts of the state by state road transport buses. Pirappancode International Swimming Pool and Thampuran Para are located here.

Demographics and economy 
 India census, Vembayam had a population of 20716 with 9905 males and 10811 females.  Traditionally Agriculture are the economic activities of people. Agricultural industry also played a vital role. Vembayam was an ideal place for Rice farming and rubber plantations. Rice is the staple food of the people of Vembayam, and, traditionally, the cultivation of rice has occupied pride of place in the agrarian economy of the Panchayath. The lush green of paddy fields is one of the most captivating features of Vembayam's landscape. But gradually reduced to the agricultural land. 
As per the data Vembayam is thick with rubber plantations. The entire paddy fields were converted into housing colonies.

Schools 
There are a number of Public and Private schools in Vembayam.

 Gvt.BHS Kanniakulangara
 Gvt. HSS Neduveli
 Gvt.LPS Kanniakulangara
 Gvt.LPS Thekkada
 New UP School Cheeranikkara
 Gvt.LPS Cheeranikkara
 Gvt. UPS Konchira
 St Thomas Vembayam
 Gvt. UP School Konchira
 Gvt.LPS Punkumoodu
 Gvt.LPS Nannattukavu
 Lourdes Mount Higher Secondary School Vattappara
 Lourdes Mount Public School Vattappara
Govt.LPS Kuttiyani

Notable personalities 
 K. P. A. C. Azeez, Malayalam Film actor
 Sankar, Film director, Screen writer and Novelist
 Vembayam Thampi , Malayalam Film actor
KG Kunjukrishnapillai, Ex MLA

Major political organizations
 Indian National Congress (i)
 Communist Party of India ( CPI)
Communist Party of India (Marxist)
Social Democratic Party of India(SDPI)
Popular Front of India
 Bharatiya Janatha Party
Indian Union Muslim League (IUML)
 Shiv Sena
Kerala Congress (M)
PDP
 All India Youth Federation of India (AlYF)
Democratic Youth Federation of India (DYFI)
 All India Students Federation (AISF)
Students Federation of India
Indian Youth Congress (i)
RSS
 Kerala Students Union (KSU)
Muslim Youth League (MYL)
Muslim Student's Federation (MSF)
Bharatiya Janatha Yuva Morcha

References

Villages in Thiruvananthapuram district